Donald T. Swinarski (February 6, 1935 – May 29, 2006) was an American businessman and politician.

Swinarski was born in Chicago, Illinois. He went to Morgan Park Academy and Oceanside Carlsbad College. He graduated from Knox College and was in the insurance business in Chicago. He served in the United States Marine Corps during the Korean War. Swinarski served on the Chicago City Council and was a Democrat. Swinarski served in the Illinois Senate from 1973 to 1975. In 1975, he was convicted accepting brides for approving zoning changes in his district. In 1976, he moved to Fort Lauderdale, Florida. Swinarski died in Fort Lauderdale, Florida. His father Theodore Swinarski also served in the Illinois General Assembly.

Notes

1936 births
2006 deaths
Businesspeople from Chicago
Politicians from Chicago
Politicians from Fort Lauderdale, Florida
Knox College (Illinois) alumni
Morgan Park Academy alumni
Military personnel from Illinois
Chicago City Council members
Democratic Party Illinois state senators
Illinois politicians convicted of corruption
20th-century American politicians
20th-century American businesspeople